Vixen 03 is an adventure novel by Clive Cussler.  This is the fourth book to feature the author's primary protagonist Dirk Pitt.

Plot introduction
In 1954 "Vixen 03", an aircraft carrying a top-secret cargo to the military's testing grounds in the South Pacific, crashes and is never recovered. Thirty-four years later while on vacation Dirk Pitt, Special Projects Director for the National Underwater and Marine Agency (NUMA), finds the remains of "Vixen 03" and her top-secret cargo.  His salvage efforts turn up some anomalies, including a body that is not of any member of the original crew; and send Pitt on a chase to stop a plot that could potentially leave millions dead.

Plot summary

In January 1954 a Boeing C-97 Stratofreighter of the United States Air Force, callsign "Vixen 03", takes off from the Buckley Naval Air Station in Colorado on a late-night flight transporting a top-secret cargo from the Rocky Mountain Arsenal to testing grounds near the Bikini Atoll in the Pacific Ocean. The aircraft never arrives at its destination in the Pacific, and, despite a massive four-month search by the Navy and Coast Guard, no trace of "Vixen 03" is discovered.

The story then jumps forward 34 years; Dirk Pitt, Special Projects Director for the National Underwater and Marine Agency (NUMA), is vacationing with Colorado Congresswoman Loren Smith at her late father's cabin in the Sawatch Mountains.  Pitt discovers some aircraft parts in the cabin garage and follows this lead until he intuits that there is an aircraft crash site in the local lake, Table Lake.  Calling for his friend and Assistant Special Projects Director Al Giordino to fly in specialized NUMA equipment, they survey the lake and quickly find the wreck of "Vixen 03".

Discovering clues found on the wreck, Pitt follows the evidence to retired Admiral Walter Bass, United States Navy, who was the commander who ordered "Vixen 03" on its top-secret mission. Bass first denies any knowledge of the aircraft, but after Pitt convinces him that he really has found the wreck, the admiral reveals that it was carrying a cargo of 16-inch battleship shells loaded with a deadly biological doomsday organism. The organism, nicknamed QD for quick death, is a virulent bacterial weapon that causes nearly instant death. The agent is described as being so deadly that just five ounces (143 ml) air-dropped over Manhattan Island would kill 98% of all human life and, because the strain actually grows stronger over time, would render the island uninhabitable for up to 300 years.

Bass is determined that this doomsday organism, which he hoped was lost forever, must never be used, and convinces Pitt, Admiral Sandecker and the rest of the NUMA team that they must secretly raise "Vixen 03" and destroy the deadly cargo. The team raises the wreck and discovers that eight of the 36 shells are missing, apparently salvaged by local divers and sold to the Phalanx Arms Company. Pitt follows the trail and is able to recover six of the eight shells, but discovers that the last two were mistakenly sold as part of a large shipment to the African Army of Revolution.

The African Army of Revolution (AAR) is an organization of black African militants led by expatriate American Hiram Lusana, with the stated goal of overthrowing the apartheid government of South Africa by using international public opinion and force against military targets. Pieter de Vaal, Minister of Defence in the South African government, develops a plan to both rid himself of the AAR and topple the existing government and put himself in power.

The plan, code-named Operation 'Wild Rose', is a false flag plot to use black mercenaries in a terrorist attack on the United States to discredit the AAR and win sympathy for the white minority government in South Africa. De Vaal recruits Captain Patrick McKenzie Fawkes, late of the Royal Navy—and who believes his family was slaughtered by the AAR—to lead the attack. The plan calls for Fawkes to take control of the former U.S. battleship USS Iowa—which has been sold for scrap and purchased by an AAR holding company—and strip her down to raise her draft and allow her to ride much higher in the water. Raising the draft will enable Fawkes to sail the ship up the Potomac River and shell Washington D.C. with her 16-inch guns.  Unbeknownst to anyone but Pitt and a few others, this will also unleash the deadly QD organism on the nation's capital.

With the help of Dale Jarvis, Director of the National Security Agency, Pitt discovers the plot. While the President and the Joint Chiefs launch a plan to take the ship and capture the shells intact, Pitt hopes to keep his promise to Admiral Bass and launches a daring mission of his own to destroy the QD warheads before they can be used – by the terrorists or the government.
When he does so, Pitt finds out – thanks to Captain Patrick McKenzie Fawkes, along with a few others – that Pieter de Vaal was behind the slaughter of his family. So, the U.S and the existing government arrange to have him become a 'cold case': a missing person. De Vaal is killed and buried in an unmarked grave – in the middle of nowhere – in Southern Africa.

Characters in Vixen 03
Admiral Walter Horatio Bass – United States Navy admiral in charge of the top-secret program that produced the biological agent thought to be destroyed when "Vixen 03" disappeared
Congressman Frederick Daggat – Democratic Party African-American Congressman who is a supporter of the African Army of Revolution (AAR) and Hiram Lusana; and who attempts to blackmail Congresswoman Loren Smith into voting in favor of granting American aid to the AAR by threatening to expose her affair with Dirk Pitt
Pieter De Vaal – Minister of Defence in the South African government; and the man who conceives Operation "Wild Rose" as a means to overthrow the current leadership of South Africa and place him in power
Captain Patrick McKenzie Fawkes – retired Captain of the British Royal Navy who is tricked into leading the 'terrorist' attack on the United States after the murder of his family, supposedly by troops of the African Army of Revolution
Al Giordino – Assistant Special Projects Director for the National Underwater and Marine Agency (NUMA)
Dale Jarvis – Director of the National Security Agency
Hiram Lusana – American born leader of the AAR, which is leading a political and military war against the white minority government of South Africa
Dirk Pitt – Special Projects Director for NUMA
Admiral James Sandecker – Chief Director of NUMA
Colonel Abe Steiger – United States Air Force officer in charge of investigating downed military aircraft
Congresswoman Loren Smith – Independent Party Congresswoman from the state of Colorado and the on again - off again lover of Dirk Pitt

Allusions/references to actual history, geography and current science
A feature common to novels by Clive Cussler is a prologue set in a period prior to the primary time setting. In Vixen 03 the prologue is quite short and deals mostly with the preparations leading up to the departure of the C-97 on its top-secret flight. During this sequence President Dwight David Eisenhower and U.S. Secretary of Defense Charles Wilson appear briefly in fictional roles.

References to the development of the Hydrogen Bomb and the military testing conducted on the Bikini Atoll appear during the story as a disguise for the testing of the QD device.

Release details
1978, United States, Viking Press, June 1978, Hardcover.
1984, United States, Bantam (reissue edition), August 1, 1984, Paperback.
2006, United States, Bantam (mass market), July 25, 2006, Paperback.

1978 American novels
Dirk Pitt novels
American adventure novels
Biological weapons in popular culture